Nature Reviews Clinical Oncology is a monthly peer-reviewed academic journal published by Nature Portfolio. The journal was renamed from Nature Clinical Practice Oncology in April 2009. Nature Reviews Clinical Oncology is one of eight Clinical Review journals published by Nature Portfolio. It covers research developments and clinical practice in oncology. The editor-in-chief is Diana Romero.

Abstracting and indexing
The journal is abstracted and indexed in:

PubMed/MEDLINE
Science Citation Index Expanded
Scopus

According to the Journal Citation Reports, the journal has a 2021 impact factor of 65.011, ranking it 3rd out of 245 journals in the category "Oncology".

References

External links
 Official website

Oncology journals
Monthly journals
Nature Research academic journals
Publications established in 2004
English-language journals
Review journals